Clifford "Cliff" Birch (1 September 1928 – 1990) was a Welsh professional footballer.

Birch was born in Newport, Monmouthshire.  A right-winger, he began his career with Ebbw Vale and joined Norwich in 1949. In 1950 he joined Newport County and made 142 English Football League appearances for the club, scoring 28 goals. In 1954 he moved to Colchester United and later to Spalding United.

References

1928 births
1990 deaths
Date of death missing
Footballers from Newport, Wales
Welsh footballers
Norwich City F.C. players
Newport County A.F.C. players
Colchester United F.C. players
English Football League players
Association football wingers
Spalding United F.C. players
Ebbw Vale F.C. players